Marco Bucci (29 November 1960 – 6 August 2013) was an Italian discus thrower. He won one medal, at senior level, at the 1983 Summer Universiade.

Biography
Bucci was born in Ferrara. He won the national championships three times. In 1980s he had a rivalry with Marco Martino. In 1984 he was forced to forfeit prior to the qualification of the discus throw at the 1984 Summer Olympics because of a stretched pectoralis muscle strain.

National records
 Discus throw: 66.96 m ( Formia, 30 June 1984) - holder to 28 May 1989

Achievements

Nationaltitles
2 wins in discus throw at the Italian Athletics Championships (1982, 1984)
1 win in discus throw at the Italian Winter Throwing Championships (1984)

See also
Italian all-time top lists - Discus throw

References

External links
 

1960 births
2013 deaths
Italian male discus throwers
Universiade medalists in athletics (track and field)
Sportspeople from Ferrara
Universiade bronze medalists for Italy
Medalists at the 1983 Summer Universiade